Sultan Kudarat, officially the Municipality of Sultan Kudarat (Maguindanaon: Inged nu Sultan Kudarat; Iranun: Inged a Sultan Kudarat), is a 1st class municipality of the province of Maguindanao del Norte, Philippines. According to the 2020 census, it has a population of 105,121 people.

Formerly known as Nuling, it became the de jure capital of the former Maguindanao province in 1977. It served as the legislative capital of Maguindanao in 2011 as it plays host to the Maguindanao Provincial Board, previously housed in the former capitol at Shariff Aguak. This restored its previous status as provincial capital, which was shared with Buluan which served as the executive capital. In 2022, Republic Act 11550 officially designated Datu Odin Sinsuat as the official capital of Maguindanao del Norte and Buluan as official capital of Maguindanao del Sur. Once a provincial capitol is erected in Datu Odin Sinsuat, the legislature will move in that municipality.

History
Sultan Kudarat town was founded as a municipality by the name Nuling on August 18, 1947 by virtue of Executive Order No. 82 signed by President Manuel Roxas. The town had its present name after it became the capital of the newly carved province of Maguindanao in 1977.

The town was part of the province of Shariff Kabunsuan from October 2006 until its nullification by the Supreme Court in July 2008.

The original seat of the Sultanate of Maguindanao was located at the mouth of the Maguindanao river (now Matampay) but later transferred to the nearby sitio at the bank of the Nuling Creek of Barangay Salimbao of this Municipality.

Sultan Mastura Kudarat, a royal lineage of the hero soldier Sultan Dipatuan Kudaratullah was appointed by American Governor Carpenter as President of the Municipal District of Nuling. The former, however, tactfully declined said and after and instead, designated his son, Datu Mamadra Mastura for the position, who served from 1922 to 1923. He was succeeded by the following executives:

 1924 to 1926, Datu Lembak Mastura;
 1927 to 1934, Datu Baraguir Mamadra;
 1935 to 1945, Datu Baraguir Mamadra, first elected Municipal district Mayor of Nuling under the Philippine Commonwealth with Barangay Salimbao as the seat of the Government of Nuling;
 1945 to 1946, Datu Dagadas Taha, appointed by President Sergio Osmeña through the recommendation of former Governor Salipada Pendatun of Cotabato Province;
 1946, Datu Abas Mastura;
 1946, Datu Ali Compania;
 1947 to 1951, Datu Mokamad Mamadra, first elected Mayor of the newly created regular Municipality of Nuling;
 1951 to 1955, Datu Osmena Mamadra;
 1956 to July 1977, Hadji Datu Sanggacala Mamadra Baraguir, first elected Municipal Mayor of the newly named Sultan Kudarat Municipality (formerly Nuling).

Almost ten years later, after the creation of the regular Municipality of Nuling on August 18, 1947, then President Carlos P. Garcia, aware on the development of the town, issued Executive Order No. 267 fixing the seat of the Municipal Government of Sultan Kudarat to Barangay Dalumangcob of the town.

 July 1977 to January 30, 1980, Datu Tucao O. Mastura, CPA, appointed by the President of the Philippines, Ferdinand E. Marcos.
On the same year, following the assumption of Mayor Mastura, President Ferdinand E. Marcos, issued Presidential Decree No. 1170, transferring the seat of Government of the Province of Maguindanao from the Municipality of Maganoy to the Municipality of Sultan Kudarat on July 11, 1977;
 January 30, 1980, to June 30, 1998, Datu Tucao O. Mastura, CPA, elected on January 30, 1980;
 July 1, 1998, to June 30, 2001, Bai Shajida Mastura-Bandila, first woman elected Municipal Mayor.

In a plebiscite conducted on March 15, 2003, the electorate of the Municipality unanimously voted in favor of the creation of a new Municipality in the name of Sultan Mastura, being a son of Sultan Dipatuan Kudaratullah, better known as Sultan Kudarat. The new Municipality of Sultan Mastura absorbed 13 barangays from the former leaving 39 for its mother town.

 July 1, 2001, to June 30, 2004, Datu Tucao O. Mastura, CPA, once again elected as Municipal Mayor unopposed;
 July 1, 2004, to June 30, 2007, Datu Tucao O. Mastura, CPA, elected again as Municipal Mayor;
 July 1, 2007, to June 30, 2010, Bai Shajida Mastuar-Bandila, again elected as Municipal Mayor of the Municipality of Sultan Kudarat, Shariff Kabunsuan, while his father, former Mayor Datu Tucao O. Mastura, CPA, ran for the position of Governor of the newly created Shariff Kabunsuan Province;
 July 1, 2010, to June 30, 2013, Datu Tucao O. Mastura, CPA returned as the Municipal Mayor of the municipality with his daughter, former mayor Bai Shajida Biruar Mastura as his Vice Mayor;
 July 1, 2013, to June 30, 2022, Datu Shameem B. Mastura, grandson of the Datu Tucao O. Mastura, CPA assumed as newly elected mayor of the municipality of Sultan Kuidarat, Maguindanao. He was the youngest mayor at the age of 23 in the Autonomous Region in Muslim Mindanao (ARMM). At that time, he was ranked as the third youngest mayor in Philippine History at the age of 23, next to Benigno Aquino Jr. at the age of 22 in Tarlac and Jono Humamoy at the age of 21 of Inabanga, Bohol in 2007.
 July 1, 2022–present, Datu Tucao O. Mastura, CPA returned as the Municipal Mayor of the municipality 

On January 23, 2021, a joint police-military operation occurred, with twelve members of the Talusan group including a former village chief, as well as a Special Action Force member, killed in a shootout. The armed group was the "most wanted" in the municipality.

Geography

Barangays
Sultan Kudarat is politically subdivided into 39 barangays.

Climate

Demographics

Economy 

The LGU had a poverty incidence of 35.1% or there are about 57,147 of the 181,419 population who are living below the ARMM's poverty threshold of 75,000 or an annual per capita income of P10,714 for the family size of 7. This poverty incidence is 1.4% lower than the National average of 32.9%.

Though Sultan Kudarat hosts seventy percent of the agro-industries of the Province of Shariff Kabunsuan, its main economy is derived from the agriculture sector.

The municipality of Sultan Kudarat hosts Lamsan, one of the largest corn products manufacturers in the Philippines. The company provides employment to hundreds of workers in the municipality and nearby towns of Maguindanao.

Farming
The municipality has 23,152.263 hectares of agricultural lands. While based on the year 2005 MAO's report, only 10,035 hectares of which or forty percent (49%) have been productively used, reflecting a yield of 121.4, 13,282 and 7,820 metric tons for copra, rice and corn respectively, earning a gross income of P169,279,300.00 for the year 2005. Its High Value Commercial crops have so far covered 273 hectares and shared a total yield of 536 metric tons that earned P9, 357,000.00.

YEAR 2010 CROP PRODUCTION
CROPS PLANTED AREA PLANTED IN HA. 
Ave. / Yield, crop, ha (in Metric Tons) / Remarks
Rice / 12,000 / 3.5 / Mostly upland rice
Corn / 10,000 / 2.5 
Coconut intercropped with corn and other crops / 12,000 / 2 (for coconut) 2,5 (for other crops) 
Mango / 2,000 / 3 
Banana / 5,000 / 5 
TOTAL: 41,000 18.2

Fishing
The town possesses vast fishing grounds, the Maguindanao and Matampay Rivers, Illana Bay, lakes and its 1,393.4 hectares fishpond have been the major source of fish that supplies the fish requirements of the municipality and its neighboring towns. However, development programs have to be introduced to fully develop its potentials.  The fish production reported is only 167,300 kilograms for the year 2005 which is not enough to supply the municipality's fish requirement of 3.9 million kilograms.

Livestock and poultry
In 2005, the Municipality of Sultan Kudarat has a total livestock population of 10,997 heads. The livestock species that are popularly raised in the municipality are carabao, cattle, and goat, probably because the town is thickly populated by the Islam believers. Its poultry population have totaled to 24,693 heads. The present livestock and poultry production of the municipality is not sufficient to supply the meat requirements of the municipality for it can only provide a total of 234,691 kilograms for the year 2005 which is very far behind the town's food requirements of about 3.7 million kilograms.

Livestock Production:

Livestock / Number of Heads / Percent to Total
 Carabao / 3,120 / 17.4
 Cattle / 4,387 / 24.4
 Goat / 8,775 / 48.9
 Swine / 960 / 5.3
 Sheep / 136 / .75
 Horse / 53 / .29
 Others / 500 / 2.7
T O T A L: 17,931 100%

Poultry Production:

Livestock / Number of Heads / Percent (%) to Total
 Chicken / 31,287 / 36.1
 Ducks / 38,732 / 44.7
 Turkeys / 6,751 / 7.79
 Geese / 9,873 / 11.39
T O T A L: 86,643 100.00%

Source: DAF-ARMM, Sultan Kudarat, Maguindanao

Social services

Education and literacy
About 79.2 percent of the municipality's school age population are literate, that is able to read and write, based on the 1995 census. The data likewise shows that 43% are in elementary level and 26% are in high school level. College undergraduate shared with 5.4%, and 2.4% are college graduate.

Health
There is one government hospital in the town, the Cotabato Sanitarium, but it caters only to specific health needs. There are about 26 Barangay Health Centers and 10 health personnel, composed of 1 medical doctor, 1 dental doctor, 6 midwives, 1 nurse and 1 sanitary inspector, serving the 39 barangays of the municipality. The health personnel are being augmented by 8 health workers and 39 trained hilots.

See also
 List of renamed cities and municipalities of the Philippines

References

External links
 Sultan Kudarat Profile at the DTI Cities and Municipalities Competitive Index
 [ Philippine Standard Geographic Code]
2000 Philippine Census Information
Local Governance Performance Management System
Inquirer.net, Sultan Kudarat town aims for nat’l recognition

Municipalities of Maguindanao del Norte
Establishments by Philippine executive order